Potarzyca  is a village in the administrative district of Gmina Jarocin, within Jarocin County, Greater Poland Voivodeship, in west-central Poland.

The village has a population of 800.

Planetarium
In Potarzyca, is a gymnasium, situated in a planetarium. It is a self-made projector made by Andrzej Owczarek, a technical teacher, in 1993 year. It may be one of the few professional planetariums in a European village.

References

Potarzyca